Lingenfelter is a German surname. Notable people with the surname include:

Dwain Lingenfelter (born 1949), Canadian politician from Saskatchewan
John Lingenfelter (1945–2003), American NHRA driver, engineer and tuner
Richard Lingenfelter (1934–2021), American physicist and historian
Steve Lingenfelter (born 1958), American basketball player
Tom Lingenfelter (born 1939), American political activist
Matthew Lingenfelter (born 1979), American Federal Government USDA USFS 

German-language surnames